High Times is a studio album by American country music singer Dottie West, released in 1981.

This album was built around the title track, "It's High Time". The single was released in early 1982 and reached No. 16 on the Billboard Country music charts, West's last Top 20 hit of her career. Another single from the album was also released, entitled "You're Not Easy to Forget", which reached No. 26 on the Billboard Country charts and No. 19 on the Cashbox Country charts. Other songs on the album focus on the more popular, Country-Pop style. The album only hit No. 43 on the "Top Country Albums" chart.

Track listing 
All tracks composed by Randy Goodrum and Brent Maher; except where indicated
"It's High Time"
"There's Nobody Like You" (Roger Miller)
"Without You" (Tom Evans, Pete Ham)
"Cajun Rage"
"You and I"
"Starting Today, Starting Over" (Johnny Slate, Larry Keith, Jim Hurt)
"Watch You Watch Me"
"Something's Missing"
"You're Not Easy to Forget" (Cynthia Weil, Tom Snow)
"Don't Be Kind" (Peter Thom, Phil Galdston)

Chart performance

Album

Singles

1981 albums
Dottie West albums
Liberty Records albums
Albums produced by Brent Maher